The 2009–10 RBS Twenty-20 Cup was the sixth edition of the domestic RBS Twenty-20 Cup in Pakistan, sponsored by the Royal Bank of Scotland. It was held from 28 February to 7 March 2010 at the National Stadium, Karachi. This edition had 13 competing teams divided into four groups. Sialkot Stallions successfully defended the title and won the tournament for the fifth consecutive time, defeating Faisalabad Wolves in the final by 5 wickets.

Results

Teams and standings
The top team from each group will qualify for the semi-finals.

 Qualified for semifinals

Knockout stage

Fixtures

Group stage

Group A

Group B

Group C

Group D

Knockout stage
Semi-finals

Final

Media coverage
 GEO Super (live) – Pakistan
 GEO TV (live) – United Kingdom, United States, Canada, Middle East

References

External links
 Royal Bank of Scotland Twenty-20 Cup 2009/10 – Cricinfo
 Royal Bank of Scotland Twenty-20 Cup 2009/10  – Cricketarchive

Domestic cricket competitions in 2009–10
2009-10 National T20 Cup
2010 in Pakistani cricket
Pakistani cricket seasons from 2000–01